The Yale School of Music (often abbreviated to YSM) is one of the 12 professional schools at Yale University. It offers three graduate degrees: Master of Music (MM), Master of Musical Arts (MMA), and Doctor of Musical Arts (DMA), as well as a joint Bachelor of Arts—Master of Music program in conjunction with Yale College, a Certificate in Performance, and an Artist Diploma.

Yale is the only Ivy League school with a separate school of music; the university also has a separate Department of Music in the Division of Humanities of the Faculty of Arts and Sciences. The School of Music is considered one of the best and most prestigious music schools in the world and has an acceptance rate of 6–8%. It has 200 students. From 1995 to 2022, the Yale School of Music’s endowment rose from $29 million to $574 million (source: Dean Blocker retirement email sent to all Yale affiliates by Peter Salovey on September 7, 2022).

Buildings
 Albert Arnold Sprague Memorial Hall (1917), renovated in 2003.
 Abby and Mitch Leigh Hall (1930), Gothic style, renovated in 2006.
 Hendrie Hall (1895), renovated in 2017.
 Adams Center for Musical Arts (2017).  The Adams Center complex includes Hendrie Hall, Leigh Hall, and new space which connects the two.
 Woolsey Hall (1901), used for orchestral performances (Yale Philharmonia) and organ recitals (on the Newberry Memorial Organ).
 The Yale University Collection of Musical Instruments (1895), Romanesque style.

Notable alumni

Musicians, Artists, Leaders 

 Gisele Ben-Dor, Orchestra conductor
Matt Brubeck, Cellist, bassist, keyboarder and arranger
Ronald Crutcher, College President
 Robert Dick, Lifetime Achievement Award winner flutist
 Dominick DiOrio, Conductor
 Juan Carlos Fernández-Nieto, Pianist
 Paul Jacobs, Grammy Award-winning organist
Henry-Louis de La Grange, Musicologist and biographer
Perry Lafferty, Television producer
Fan Lei, Clarinetist
 Martin Leung, Pianist known as the Video Game Pianist
 Achilles Liarmakopoulos, Trombonist
 Jahja Ling, Conductor and pianist
 Ruth Muzzy Conniston Morize, Musician and socialite
 Aldo Parisot, Cellist and professor
 Johann Sebastian Paetsch, Cellist and musician
 Joseph W. Polisi, College President
 Ravi S. Rajan, College President
Kay George Roberts, Founder and musical conductor of the New England Ochestra
Joshua Rosenblum, Conductor, arranger and music journalist
Willie Ruff, Jazz musician
Moni Simeonov, Violinist
Stephen Simon, Conductor and arranger
Jian Wang, Cellist

Vocalists 

 Janna Baty, Mezzo-soprano opera singer
 Dorothy Bishop, Singer and comedian
Howard Boatwright, Violinist and musicologist
Christopher Magiera, Operatic baritone
Eddie Mayehoff, American actor

Composers 
Andy Akiho, Composer
Timo Andres, Composer and pianist
Tanya Anisimova, Cellist and Composer
Daniel Asia, Composer
Matthew Barnson, Composer
Robert Beaser, Composer
 Jeremy Beck, Composer
Marco Beltrami, Academy Award nominated composer and Golden Globe winner
Christopher Cerrone, Contemporary classical music composer
Jacob Cooper, Composer
Emma Lou Diemer, Composer
 Reena Esmail, Pianist and composer
Eugene Friesen, Cellist and Composer
 Michael Gilbertson, Composer
Judd Greenstein, Contemporary classical music composer and promoter
 Juliana Hall, Composer of art songs and vocal chamber music
 Ted Hearne, Singer and composer
Aaron Jay Kernis, Grammy Award and 1998 Pulitzer Prize for Music winning composer
Lori Laitman, Opera composer
David Lang, Grammy Award and 2008 Pulitzer Prize for Music winning composer
Hannah Lash, Concert music composer
Peter Scott Lewis, Composer
 Scott Lindroth, Composer
Missy Mazzoli, Composer and pianist
Harold Meltzer, Composer
Andrew Norman, Contemporary classical music composer
 Kevin Puts, 2012 Pulitzer Prize for Music winning composer
Caroline Shaw, 2013 Pulitzer Prize for Music winning composer
Sarah Kirkland Snider, Composer
 Jan Swafford, Author and Composer
Christopher Theofanidis, Composer
 Ken Ueno, Composer

Distinguished members of faculty
 John Adams, Professor of Composition (past)
 Nancy Allen, Professor of Harp (past)
 Emanuel Ax, Visiting Professor of Piano (past)
 Martin Beaver, Artist in Residence (past)
 Boris Berman, Professor of Piano
 Martin Bresnick, Professor of Composition
 Simon Carrington, Professor of Choral Conducting
 Allan Dean, Professor of Trumpet (past)
 Jacob Druckman, Professor of Composition (past)
 Lukas Foss, Visiting Professor of Composition (past)
 Claude Frank, Professor of Piano
 Peter Frankl, Professor of Piano
 Erick Friedman, Professor of Violin (past)
 Sidney Harth, Professor of Violin (past)
 Paul Hindemith, Professor of Music (1940–53)
 Martin Jean, Professor of Organ
 Betsy Jolas, Visiting Professor of Composition (past)
 Ani Kavafian, Professor of Violin
 Aaron Jay Kernis, Professor of Composition
 Ezra Laderman, Professor of Composition (past)
 David Lang, Professor of Composition
 Ingram Marshall, Visiting Professor of Composition (past)
 Donald Martino, Professor of Music Theory (1959–69)
 Robert Mealy, Professor of Violin
 Thomas Murray, Professor of Organ
 Donald Palma, Professor of Double Bass
 Aldo Parisot, Professor of Cello
 Krzysztof Penderecki, Professor of Composition (1973–79)
 Mel Powell, Professor of Composition (1957–69)
 Joseph Schwantner, Professor of Composition (past)
 Charles Seeger, Visiting Professor of the Theory of Music (1949–50)
 David Shifrin, Professor of Clarinet
 Oscar Shumsky, Professor of Violin (past)
 Robert van Sice, Professor of Percussion
 Morton Subotnick, Professor of Composition (past)
 Masaaki Suzuki, Professor of Choral Conducting
 Toru Takemitsu, Visiting Professor of Composition (1975)
 Christopher Theofanidis, Professor of Composition
 Rosalyn Tureck, Visiting Professor of Keyboard (past)
 Keith Wilson, Professor of Clarinet (1946–87)
 Ransom Wilson, Professor of Flute (past)

References

Further reading

External links

Yale School of Music Papers at Irving S. Gilmore Music Library, Yale University
Yale School of Music D.M.A. Papers, Irving S. Gilmore Music Library, Yale University

 
Music School
Educational institutions established in 1894
Music schools in Connecticut
1894 establishments in Connecticut